His Excellency Dauda Danladi, MNI is the former Nigerian Ambassador to the Islamic Republic of Pakistan (2012-2015) and was the authority in charge of the Nigerian Embassy in Islamabad, ICT.

Previously he worked as the alternate Director and later Substantive Director on the Board of the Northern Nigeria Development Cooperation (NNDC), and on the Governing Board of the Administrative Staff College of Nigeria. He was appointed Nigerian High Commissioner to Pakistan in 2012. 
The Nigerian High Commission was founded in 1965 and is continuously working to co-ordinate, promote and protect the national interests of Nigeria within the Islamic Republic of Pakistan in ways that contribute to the enhancement of Nigeria's security and socio-economic prosperity.
Since its foundation, the High Commission is looking into the concerns like consular and welfare matters, Immigration affairs, legal and education, bilateral political and multilateral relations, trade and economic affairs, information dissemination, and all general enquiries to assist Nigerian residents in the Islamic Republic of Pakistan and the general public.

Introduction 

Ambassador Dauda Danladi, mni, Former Nigeria High Commissioner to Pakistan, was born on 7 November 1957, in the city of Biu, in the State of Borno. He holds a diploma from Wimbledon College, London, a bachelor of Business Education Degree (BB.ED) from Ahmadu Bello University Zaria and a master's degree in Public Administration (MPA) from University of Liverpool, UK in 1992.  He bagged Defence Diplomacy from Cranfield Military Science University, UK and is a member of the Nigerian National Institute for Policy and Strategic Studies.

The list of Educational Institutions he attended are as follows:

•	LEA PRIMARY SCHOOL U/RIMI KADUNA					1965-1971

•	STAFF TRAINING CENTRE POTISKUMM					 1975-1976

•	KADUNA POLYTECHNIC							1977-1980

•	WIMBLEDON COLLEGE, LONDON						1980
	
•	AHMADU BELLO UNIVERSITY, ZARIA						1984-1987

•	UNIVERSITY OF LIVERPOOL, UNITED KINGDOM				 1990-1991

•	CRANFIELD UNIVERSITY							2001

•	NATIONAL INSTITUTE FOR POLICY AND STRATEGIC STUDIES 		 2006

Educational Qualifications 

Mr. Ambassador currently holds the following Educational Qualifications under his belt:

•	GENERAL CERTIFICATE OF EDUCATION (GCE).

•	ORDINARY NATIONAL DIPLOMA.

•	PITMAN TEACHERS DIPLOMA, LONDON.

•	BACHELOR OF BUSINESS EDUCATION DEGREE (B.B.ED.) A.B.U ZARIA.

•	MARSTER’S IN PUBLIC ADMINISTRATION, UNIVERSITY OF LIVERPOOL.

•	DEFENCE DIPLOMACY-CRANFIELD UNIVERSITY, UNITED KINGDOM.

•	MEMBER OF NATIONAL INSTITUTE. (mni)

H.E. DAUDA DANLADI holds the title of Damburan of Biu and has been the President of Biu Emirate Development Association, contributing to the social, educational and cultural development of the four (4) Local Government Areas of the Emirate. He was a pioneer for the establishment of the Nigerian Television Authority (NTA) Station, transmitting in Biu and Southern Borno State.

Working Experience 

Mr. Ambassador began his Civil Service Career in 1980 in the Borno State Civil Service of Nigeria and rose to the position of Permanent Secretary.  He served in various Ministries.  He was appointed to the highest position in the State Civil Service as Secretary to the Borno State Government and Head of Service in 1998.  In 2000, he transferred his service to the Federal Service and have served as director, Joint Services Dept. and later Director of Administration in the Ministry of Defence; Director of Programme National Poverty Eradication Programme and Director in charge of Management Development Institutions support and linkages office of the Head of the Civil Service of the Federation.

He served as alternate director and later substantive director on the Board of the Northern Nigeria Development Cooperation (NNDC), and on the Governing Board of the Administrative Staff College of Nigeria.  He resigned in 2009 and joined politics. He was appointed Nigerian High Commissioner to Pakistan in 2012.

He holds the National Productive Merit Award and has attended various courses in the United States, the United Kingdom and France.  Help is also accredited to the Republic of Maldives and the Islamic Republic of Afghanistan. 
    
A brief overview of H.E.’s work experience is as follows:

1.	Appointed in Borno State Civil Service in 1980 and Posted to Governor’s Office 1980-1983.

2.	Served as Special Duties and Personal Assistant to the then Military Governor of Borno State Col. Abdulmumini Aminu, Group Capt Ibrahim Dada From 1984-1990.

3.	Served as Director (Admin.) Governor’s Office, Maiduguri, Borno State 1991-1992.

4.	Posted as Director Borno State Liaison Office Kaduna/Abuja 1994.

5.	Served as alternate Director on the Board of NNDC-1994-1995.

6.	Appointed Permanent Secretary Borno State Civil Service-1996.

7.	Appointed Secretary to the Government and Head of Service Borno State -1998–1999.

8.	Holder of National Productivity Merit Award 1999 Borno State Chapter.

9.	Transferred to the Federal Civil Service as a Director in 2000 and Posted to Ministry of Defence.

10.	Served briefly as Director Joint Services Department and later Director Administration, Ministry of Defence-2004. At the height of ECOMOG operation in Liberia and Sierra-Leone.

11.	Nominated to attend the Senior Executive Course No.28 (2006) at the National Institute for Policy and Strategic Studies, Kuru Jos.

12.	Posted to National Poverty Eradication Programme the Presidency, (NAPED) as Director of Programmes (2007–2008) He was a pioneer for the launching of conditional cash grant to the poor as well as other society safety nets.

13.	Posted as Director Office of the Permanent Secretary, Federal Ministry of Youths 2008.

14.	Posted as Director Management Development Institutions, Support and Linkages, Office of the Head of the Civil Service of the Federation, February, 2009.

15.	Appointed Nigeria High Commissioner to Islamic Republic of Pakistan with Concurrent Accreditation To Islamic Republic of Afghanistan and Republic of Maldives 2012 to 2015.

Courses & Seminars 

During his career, some of the courses and seminars H.E. has attended are as following:
1.	Participant at a Seminar for the Senior Leaders of the Ministry of Defence and Armed Forces on the Civil Military Decision-Making 14–28 January 2000.

2.	Participant at the seminar on International Military Legal System organized by USA Defence Institute of International Legal Studies 18–22 September 2000.

3.	Attended the Blue Pelican Exercise 2000, (United Kingdom, French and West African Map Group exercise dealing with logistics support strategy) 25–27 October 2000.

4.	Attended a Course on Managing Defence in a Democratic Setting at Canfield University Royal Military College Of Science, Stravenham, United Kingdom From 4 June To 19 July 2001.

5.	Attended Senior Leader Seminar at the African Centre for Strategic Studies, Washington U.S.A 4–5 February 2002.

6.	Participant at the seminar on Civil-Military Relations organized by the Centre for Civil Military Relations Monterey California, 11 15 September 2002.

7.	Attended a two weeks Course on Current Issues, new ideas and best Practices in development management at Hetta International Development Centre, New York, U.S.A 2005.

8.	Participant Senior Exercise Course No.28 (2006) National Institute for Policy and Strategic Studies, Kuru Jos

Personal life

Dauda Danladi has 5 kids (Faiza Dauda, Hadiza Dauda, Mohammed Dauda, Sumayyah Dauda, Yusrah Dauda, Nafisat Dauda, and Abdulmajeed Dauda).

References

High Commissioners of Nigeria to Pakistan
1957 births
Living people